

History
The Dublin Institute of Technology has offered modules and courses in Computing since 1971. The original Computing course was entitled "WMT (Wholetime Mathematical Technician)" which has successfully continued for over 30 years with updating and additions resulting in the current " BSc. (Honours) Degree in Computing" course (DT211).

The WMT course was soon followed by a joint degree offered with other Schools in the College of Science and Health entitled "WSAD (Wholetime Scientific Applied Degree)" (DT225) which ran successfully for 15 years, and taught computing topics in conjunction with physics, chemistry, biology, and mathematics topics.

The School of Computing was founded in 2001 when it split from the then existing School of Mathematics, Statistics and Computing and has operated as an independent School since then. It offers four undergraduate degrees and five postgraduate degrees.

About the School
The School of Computing, located in the Kevin Street Campus of the Dublin Institute of Technology, was founded in 2001. At that time there were twenty academic staff, which has since increased to forty staff, and over four hundred students. The Head of School is Dr. Deirdre Lillis. The School of Computing emphasises Industry oriented education full-time and part-time undergraduate and postgraduate courses.

International collaborations
The School of Computing has collaborations with other educational institutes, including;
 Harbin Institute of Technology, China
 Institute of Finance Management, Tanzania

External links
School of Computing Website
School of Computing Continuing Professional Development Short Courses

References

S